"Be Someone" is a song by British DJ and production duo CamelPhat and British singer-songwriter Jake Bugg. Following its premiere as BBC Radio 1 DJ Annie Mac's Hottest Record, it was released as a single through RCA Records from CamelPhat's upcoming debut studio album on 4 June 2019. The song was co-written by CamelPhat and Bugg.

Critical reception
Writing for Clash, Robin Murray commented that the track "matches blissful house, huge drops, and a euphoric atmosphere to Jake Bugg's instantly recognisable vocals", and is "certainly something different from the songwriter [Bugg]".

Track listing

Charts

Weekly charts

Year-end charts

Certifications

Release history

References

2019 singles
2019 songs
CamelPhat songs
Jake Bugg songs
Songs written by Jake Bugg
Songs written by Mike Di Scala